Agia Varvara is a village and a former municipality in the Heraklion regional unit, Crete, Greece. Since the 2011 local government reform it is part of the municipality Gortyn, of which it is a municipal unit. Population 4,587 (2011). The village lies at an altitude of about 580 meters and has 2,043 inhabitants.

Agia Varvara lies on the busy north–south road from Heraklion on the north coast of the island towards the centre.

References

Populated places in Heraklion (regional unit)